RayaJet (or RAYAJET or Raya Jet) is an airline based in Amman, Jordan which was launched in April 2005 and specializes in private jet charters.

Code data
 ICAO Code: RYT

Fleet
RayaJet operates one Challenger CL-601 aircraft

External links
Official website

Airlines of Jordan
Airlines established in 2005
Jordanian companies established in 2005